Roland Lescure (born 26 November 1966) is a French banker and politician who has been serving as Minister Delegate for Industry in the government of Prime Minister Élisabeth Borne since 2022.

Prior to joining the government, Lescure served as a member of the National Assembly since 2017. A member of Renaissance, he represents the first constituency for French residents overseas (Canada and United States).

Early life and career
Lescure was born in Paris and raised in Montreuil. His father was a journalist for L'Humanité, while his mother was a trade unionist for the Paris Transport Authority. He studied at the École Polytechnique and the London School of Economics.

Lescure worked as a money manager in France before moving to Montreal, Quebec to take a job as chief investment officer of the Caisse de dépôt et placement du Québec, reporting directly to his superior, the Caisse's president Michael Sabia.

Political career
In parliament, Lescure served as chairman of the Committee on Economic Affairs from 2017 to 2022. In this capacity, he was also the parliament's rapporteur on the privatization of Groupe ADP.

In September 2018, after François de Rugy's appointment to the government, Lescure supported Richard Ferrand's candidacy for the presidency of the National Assembly. Once Ferrand was elected, he stood as a candidate to succeed him as president of the LREM parliamentary group. After having won in the first round, he lost in the second round against Gilles Le Gendre.

Following the 2022 legislative elections, Lescure stood again as a candidate for the National Assembly's presidency; in an internal vote, he lost against Yaël Braun-Pivet.

Political positions
In July 2019, Lescure voted in favour of the French ratification of the European Union’s Comprehensive Economic and Trade Agreement (CETA) with Canada.

In 2021, Lescure publicly criticized Minister of the Economy and Finance Bruno Le Maire, arguing that the Castex government's rejection of a proposed $20 billion takeover of Carrefour by Canada’s Alimentation Couche-Tard was due partly by a desire to control domestic food supplies.

In January 2021, as a member of the "Hunting, fishing and territories" study group, the deputy voted in favor of the defense and promotion of hunter's leisure.

Personal life
Lescure is married to an Irish woman.

References

1966 births
Living people
La République En Marche! politicians
French emigrants to Canada
École Polytechnique alumni
Alumni of the London School of Economics
Deputies of the 15th National Assembly of the French Fifth Republic
Politicians from Paris
Members of the Borne government
Members of Parliament for French people living outside France